William Henry Morin (May 23, 1869 – August 29, 1935) was a boatswain's mate second class serving in the United States Navy during the Spanish–American War who received the Medal of Honor for bravery.

Biography
Morin was born May 23, 1869, in England and enlisted the United States Navy on November 17, 1892.

During the Spanish–American War he was a boatswain's mate second class aboard the cruiser U.S.S. Marblehead.  In July 1898 he assisted in the clearing of 27 contact mines from Guantanamo Bay, Cuba, for which he, and two others, received the Medal of Honor in December of that year.

Morin was warranted to the rank of boatswain on July 30, 1903, and retired from the Navy on April 12, 1910.

In 1916, Morin became the first reported naval officer to be court-martialed.  He was convicted of disobeying a lawful order of the Secretary of the Navy and three specifications of conduct unbecoming an officer and gentlemen predicated on his failure to pay certain debts.  Despite holding the Medal of Honor, he was dismissed from the Navy on October 10, 1916.

He died at age 66 on August 29, 1935, and is buried in Saint John Cemetery Middle Village, New York. His grave can be found in section 25, row B.

Medal of Honor citation
Rank and organization: Boatswain's Mate Second Class, U.S. Navy. Born: 23 May 1869, England. G.O. No.: 500, 14 December 1898.

Citation:

On board the U.S.S. Marblehead at the approaches to Caimanera, Guantanamo Bay, Cuba, 26 and 27 July 1898. Displaying heroism, Morin took part in the perilous work of sweeping for and disabling 27 contact mines during this period.

See also

List of Medal of Honor recipients for the Spanish–American War

References

External links

1869 births
1935 deaths
United States Navy Medal of Honor recipients
United States Navy sailors
American military personnel of the Spanish–American War
English emigrants to the United States
English-born Medal of Honor recipients
Spanish–American War recipients of the Medal of Honor